Widia may refer to:
 Widia (hero), also known as Wudga, a hero in several early Germanic legends
 Widia (metal), hard material used for machining
 Widia Products Group, a subsidiary of Kennametal, umbrella brand of cutting tools 
 Widia (king), a king of Ashkalon in the 14th century BCE, who wrote several of the Amarna letters.